Marcel Capelle (1904–1996) was a professional French association footballer who played in defence.

Career 
 1929–1933 : RC France 
 1933–1934 : FC Sète 
 1934–1935 : AS Saint-Étienne 
 1935–1936 : Stade de Reims

Honours

Club
 Division 1 (1): 
Sète: 1934

References

External links

1904 births
1996 deaths
French footballers
France international footballers
1930 FIFA World Cup players
Racing Club de France Football players
FC Sète 34 players
AS Saint-Étienne players
Ligue 1 players
Association football defenders